Zeta Arietis, Latinized from ζ Arietis, is the Bayer designation for a star in the northern constellation of Aries. It is dimly visible to the naked eye with an apparent visual magnitude of +4.89. This is an A-type main sequence star with a stellar classification of A1 V. It has a high rate of rotation with a projected rotational velocity of 133 km/s. The star is shining at an effective temperature of 9,500 K, giving it the characteristic white-hued glow of an A-type star.

Name

This star, along with  δ Ari, ε Ari, π Ari, and ρ3 Ari, were Al Bīrūnī's Al Buṭain (ألبطين), the dual of Al Baṭn, the Belly. According to the catalogue of stars in the Technical Memorandum 33-507 - A Reduced Star Catalog Containing 537 Named Stars, Al Buṭain were the title for five stars : δ Ari as Botein, π Ari as Al Buṭain I, ρ3 Ari as Al Buṭain II, ε Ari as Al Buṭain III dan ζ Ari as Al Buṭain IV.

References

A-type main-sequence stars
Aries (constellation)
Arietis, Zeta
Durchmusterung objects
Arietis, 58
020150
015110
0972